Alain Joly is a French businessman. He was CEO of Air Liquide.

References

Living people
Year of birth missing (living people)
École Polytechnique alumni
21st-century French businesspeople
Place of birth missing (living people)
Businesspeople in aviation
Air Liquide people